Joel Przybilla (born October 10, 1979) is an American retired professional basketball player who played the center position for 13 seasons in the National Basketball Association (NBA).

High school career 
Przybilla was born in Monticello, Minnesota, and attended Monticello High School, where he was coached by Max LaVelle of the Monticello Magic. He was named 1998 Minnesota Mr. Basketball, along with Darius Lane. He was also named to USA Today's All-USA second team and earned Parade All-American honors, and was a two-time Associated Press Minnesota Player of the Year honoree.

College career 
Przybilla spent two years at the University of Minnesota and left as second on the Golden Gophers' all-time single-season list with 84 blocks. He finished his sophomore season first in the Big Ten in field goal percentage, second in blocks and third in rebounding.

College statistics

|-
| style="text-align:left;"| 1998–99
| style="text-align:left;"| Minnesota
| 28 ||  || 25.5 || .560 || .000 || .577 || 5.8 || 1.5 || .0 || .0 || 6.7
|-
| style="text-align:left;"| 1999–2000
| style="text-align:left;"| Minnesota
| 21 ||  || 30.4 || .613 || .000 || .495 || 8.4 || 2.4 || .8 || 3.9 || 14.2
|-

NBA career 
Przybilla was selected with the 9th overall pick in the 2000 NBA draft by the Houston Rockets, but was later traded to the Milwaukee Bucks for their first-round pick, Jason Collier, and a future first-round pick on draft night. After playing for the Bucks for over three seasons, on February 15, 2004, he was traded to the Atlanta Hawks in a three-team trade.

On August 25, 2004, Przybilla signed a two-year deal with the Portland Trail Blazers. He made an immediate impact averaging 7.7 rebounds and 2.1 blocks per game in the 2004–05 NBA season. On July 17, 2006, he re-signed with the Trail Blazers to a reported five-year, $32 million contract. Bill Duffy, Przybilla's agent, explained his reasons for re-signing with the Blazers this way: "He's extremely loyal, and they gave him an opportunity two years ago when no one else did."

On March 22, 2008, Przybilla recorded a career-high 25 rebounds, two shy of the franchise record overall and one shy of the franchise record in a regulation game. On January 2, 2009, he was fined $7,500 and assessed a flagrant foul for striking Tyson Chandler.

In a game against the Dallas Mavericks on December 22, 2009, he suffered a ruptured patella tendon as well as a dislocated patella after landing awkwardly on his right knee. Two days later, he had surgery to repair the tear in the tendon and missed the rest of the 2009–10 season.

On February 24, 2011, Przybilla was traded, along with Dante Cunningham, Sean Marks and two future first-round draft picks, to the Charlotte Bobcats in exchange for Gerald Wallace.

On February 27, 2012, Przybilla re-signed with the Portland Trail Blazers.

On August 9, 2012, Przybilla signed with the Milwaukee Bucks, with whom he began his NBA career. His final NBA game was played on February 11, 2013, in a 90 - 102 loss to the Washington Wizards where he recorded only 3 rebounds in under 5 minutes of playing time.

On August 25, 2014, Przybilla officially retired from the NBA after sitting out the entire 2013–14 season.

NBA career statistics

Regular season

|-
| align="left" | 
| align="left" | Milwaukee
| 33 || 13 || 8.2 || .343 || – || .273 || 2.2 || .1 || .1 || .9 || .8
|-
| align="left" | 
| align="left" | Milwaukee
| 71 || 62 || 15.9 || .535 || .000 || .422 || 4.0 || .3 || .3 || 1.7 || 2.7
|-
| align="left" | 
| align="left" | Milwaukee
| 32 || 17 || 17.1 || .391 || – || .500 || 4.5 || .4 || .3 || 1.4 || 1.5
|-
| align="left" | 
| align="left" | Milwaukee
| 5 || 0 || 6.6 || .000 || – || .500 || 2.0 || .6 || .0 || .0 || .2
|-
| align="left" | 
| align="left" | Atlanta
| 12 || 12 || 26.2 || .360 || – || .414 || 8.4 || .3 || .4 || 1.4 || 4.0
|-
| align="left" | 
| align="left" | Portland
| 76 || 50 || 24.4 || .598 || – || .517 || 7.7 || 1.0 || .3 || 2.1 || 6.4
|-
| align="left" | 
| align="left" | Portland
| 56 || 52 || 24.9 || .548 || – || .532 || 7.0 || .8 || .4 || 2.3 || 6.1
|-
| align="left" | 
| align="left" | Portland
| 43 || 43 || 16.3 || .474 || – || .370 || 3.9 || .3 || .2 || 1.6 || 2.0
|-
| align="left" | 
| align="left" | Portland
| 77 || 67 || 23.6 || .576 || .000 || .680 || 8.4 || .4 || .2 || 1.2 || 4.8
|-
| align="left" | 
| align="left" | Portland
| 82 || 43 || 23.8 || .625 || .000 || .663 || 8.7 || .3 || .4 || 1.2 || 5.5
|-
| align="left" | 
| align="left" | Portland
| 30 || 9 || 22.7 || .523 || – || .647 || 7.9 || .3 || .3 || 1.4 || 4.1
|-
| align="left" | 
| align="left" | Portland
| 31 || 9 || 14.4 || .618 || – || .565 || 3.9 || .4 || .2 || .5 || 1.8
|-
| align="left" | 
| align="left" | Charlotte
| 5 || 0 || 14.8 || .400 || – || .250 || 4.8 || .0 || .0 || .2 || 1.8
|-
| align="left" | 
| align="left" | Portland
| 27 || 19 || 16.6 || .458 || – || .611 || 5.1 || .2 || .2 || .6 || 2.0
|-
| align="left" | 
| align="left" | Milwaukee
| 12 || 1 || 5.7 || .250 || – || .000 || 1.8 || .3 || .1 || .2 || .2
|- class="sortbottom"
| style="text-align:center;" colspan="2"| Career
| 592 || 397 || 19.8 || .552 || .000 || .557 || 6.2 || .4 || .3 || 1.4 || 3.9

Playoffs

|-
| align="left" | 2001
| align="left" | Milwaukee
| 1 || 0 || 2.0 || .000 || – || – || .0 || .0 || .0 || .0 || .0
|-
| align="left" | 2003
| align="left" | Milwaukee
| 4 || 3 || 8.3 || 1.000 || – || – || 2.5 || .3 || .0 || .5 || .5
|-
| align="left" | 2009
| align="left" | Portland
| 6 || 6 || 27.0 || .556 || – || .500 || 7.3 || 1.3 || .7 || 2.0 || 3.8
|- class="sortbottom"
| style="text-align:center;" colspan="2"| Career
| 11 || 9 || 17.9 || .579 || – || .500 || 4.9 || .8 || .4 || 1.3 || 2.3

Personal life 
Przybilla was born the third of four children of Doug, an American Express employee, and Linda Przybilla, a middle school teacher's assistant. He is of German (maternally) and Polish descent. He and his wife, Noelle, have two sons, Anthony and Jayden.

References

External links

NBA.com Profile
Przybilla — I
Przybilla — II

Living people
1979 births
American men's basketball players
American people of German descent
American people of Polish descent
Atlanta Hawks players
Basketball players from Minnesota
Charlotte Bobcats players
Centers (basketball)
Houston Rockets draft picks
McDonald's High School All-Americans
Milwaukee Bucks players
Minnesota Golden Gophers men's basketball players
Parade High School All-Americans (boys' basketball)
People from Wright County, Minnesota
Portland Trail Blazers players
Sportspeople from the Minneapolis–Saint Paul metropolitan area